Ukrainian oligarchs (Ukrainian: українські олігархи, romanized: ukrayins'ki oliharkhy) are business oligarchs who emerged on the economic and political scene of Ukraine after the 1991 Ukrainian independence referendum. This period saw Ukraine transitioning to a market economy, with the rapid privatization of state-owned assets. Those developments mirrored those of the neighboring post-Soviet states after the dissolution of the Soviet Union. The influence of Ukrainian oligarchs on domestic and regional politics, particularly their links to Russia, has been the source of criticism from pro-Western sources critical of Ukraine’s lack of political reform or action against corruption.

In 2008, the combined wealth of Ukraine's 50 richest oligarchs was equal to 85% of Ukraine's GDP. In November 2013, this number was 45% (of GDP). By 2015, due to the Russo-Ukrainian War, the total net worth of the five richest and most influential Ukrainians at that time (Rinat Akhmetov, Viktor Pinchuk, Ihor Kolomoyskyi, Henadiy Boholyubov and Yuriy Kosiuk) had dropped from $21.6 billion in 2014 to $11.85 billion in June 2015. (In 2014, Ukrainian GDP fell by 7%; in 2015, it shrank 12%.)

Usage
Oligarchs are usually defined as businessmen having direct influence on both politics and the economy. During the 1990s, the oligarchs emerged as politically-connected entrepreneurs who started from nearly nothing and got rich through participation in the market via connections to the corrupt — but democratically elected — government of Ukraine during the state's transition to a market-based economy. Later, numerous Ukrainian business-people have "taken over control" of political parties (examples of this are Party of Greens of Ukraine, Labour Ukraine and Social Democratic Party of Ukraine (united)) or started new ones to gain seats and influence in the Verkhovna Rada (Ukrainian parliament).

The rise of the oligarchs has been connected to the processes of privatization of state-owned assets. These processes usually involved the distribution of property titles of such enterprises, land, and real estate, on equal base to the whole population of the country, through instruments such as privatization vouchers, certificates, and coupons. Given the different preferences of people in relation to risk-aversity, property titles were easily re-sold. Businessmen who could provide initial investment capital were able to collect those property titles and thus take control over former public holdings.

National security concerns of various Western nations from the oligarchic kleptocracy have been alleged since the early 2000s.  The issue gained greater salience after the 2022 Russian invasion of Ukraine where widespread sanctions were enforced against both Russian and Ukrainian oligarchs in March through May 2022, and the national security implications of oligarch funds when a great deal of money—sourced from Ukraine or Russia but spent in the West—finds its way into influencing matters of national security.

The oligarchs' influence on the Ukrainian government is extreme. In 2011 some analysts and Ukrainian politicians believed that some Ukrainian businesses tycoons, with "lucrative relations" with Russia, were deliberately hindering Ukraine's European Union integration.

List of oligarchs by wealth
In total, the top 100 wealthiest business people in Ukraine control around $44,5 billion, according to Forbes, which accounts for 27% of Ukrainian GDP in September, 2021.

The top 10 Ukrainian oligarchs in 2021 were identified as:

Chernenko study
An economic study by Demid Chernenko identified 35 oligarchic groups based on data points between 2002–2016:

See also
List of Ukrainians by net worth
Political parties in Ukraine
Russian oligarchs
Business magnate
History of post-Soviet Russia#Rise of the oligarchs
Oligarchy
Robber baron (industrialist)
Corruption in Ukraine

References

External links
 Chernovetsky enters Wprost list of 100 richest people by Kyiv Post (October 22, 2008)
 To Catch an Oligarch by Jason Felch and Justin Kane, Center for Investigative Reporting (October 4, 2004)

Politics of Ukraine
Economy of Ukraine
Crime in Ukraine
Economic history of Ukraine
Social history of Ukraine

Social groups
+